Emil Artur Longen, born  Emil Václav František Pitterman (29 July 1885, Pardubice – 24 April 1936, Benešov) was a Czech playwright, director, actor, screenwriter and painter. He was initially drawn to Post-Impressionism and Expressionism, but was also influenced by Cubism. In addition to painting, he created illustrations and caricatures for various periodicals.

Biography 
His father was a notary, originally from Vlašim. After 1904, he studied at the Academy of Fine Arts, Prague, with František Thiele. In 1907, he participated in founding the artists' association, . He was expelled from the Academy in 1908, for disciplinary infractions.

Although focused on art, he was also attracted to the theater and the cabaret. Around 1909, he began to collaborate with the writer and actor, Eduard Bass. It was then that he first used the pseudonym "Longen".  Over the next twenty years, he would become a prominent figure in many Prague cabarets, including the famous  (Red Seven). In 1910, he married the actress, Xena Marková.

In 1911, he made his mark at the beginnings of Czech cinema, co-authoring and starring in a series of four short comedies about a bon-vivant named Rudi. He also directed the last film in the series, Rudi Sportsman.

In 1921, he was in his first full-length silent film; Otrávené světlo (The Poisoned Light), playing a magician opposite Karel Lamač and Anny Ondra. For a time, he also worked abroad; in Paris, Ljubljana and Berlin. Back in Prague in 1925, he and the director, agreed to merge their theater companies to create a new company named  (an acronym for "Spojené ensembly Českého studia E. A. Longena"). It was short-lived, however, so he became an actor and dramaturge at the new . While there, in 1927, he wrote a biography of the theater's founder, the comedian Vlasta Burian.

Despite his professional successes, his marriage proved to be a very unhappy one. Xena felt disrespected, became depressed, addicted to morphine and cocaine and, in 1928, committed suicide by jumping from a window. Later that same year, he remarried, to Maria Uhlířová, apparently also an actress, and they had two children. He wrote a biographical novel in Xena's honor, called Herečka (Actress)

Since his student days, he had been known for his Bohemian lifestyle and explosive temperament, and was intoxicated almost daily. Much of his considerable income was squandered, and he was perpetually in debt. During the last half of his life, his paintings increasingly came to serve as little more than a way to help pay those debts. He died in 1936, in Beneš Hospital, at the age of fifty, from a perforated ulcer.

Selected paintings

References

Further reading 
 Various authors, Dějiny českého divadla/IV, Academia, Prague, 1983, pp.;40, 47, 50–52, 96, 158–161, 171–2, 182, 268, 374, 520, 590, 591, 596–7, 603, 611–2, 642, 647–8
 Z. Sílová, R. Hrdinová, A. Kožíková and V. Mohylová : Divadlo na Vinohradech 1907–2007 – Vinohradský ansámbl, vydalo Divadlo na Vinohradech, Prague, 2007, pp204–5

External links 

 More works by Longen @ ArtNet
 Entry on Longen @ the Česko-Slovenská filmová databáze
 Entry on Longen @ abART
 Emil Artur Longen, Jaroslav Hašek (biography), Beaufort publishing, 1928 (Full text online @ Bohemian Library)
 "Emil Artur Longen brought both Švejk and Lenin to the scene for the first time" by David Hertl @ Český rozhlas

1885 births
1936 deaths
Czech painters
Czech actors
Czech screenwriters
Male screenwriters
Czech directors
Deaths from ulcers
People from Pardubice